"Holdin' On" is a song by Tane Cain from her self-titled 1982 debut album. The song reached No. 37 on the Billboard Hot 100, her only top 40 song. Author Wayne Jancik included the song in their book "The Billboard Book of One-hit Wonders".

Music video
The music video features Tane Cain strutting by wind machines before playing with her band which featured her then-husband Jonathan Cain.

Charts

References

RCA Records singles
1982 singles
1982 songs
Songs written by Jonathan Cain
Song recordings produced by Keith Olsen